HMS Satellite was a wooden screw corvette launched on 26 September 1855 at Devonport for the Royal Navy. In 1856–1861 she served in the Pacific and in 1861–1865 she served off the south east coast of North America.. On 13 June 1860, she ran aground on a reef in the Pacific Ocean. Repairs cost £555. Between 1866 and 1870 she served on the China station, sailing home with the Flying Squadron. She was broken up at Devonport in 1879.

References

 

1855 ships
Ships built in Plymouth, Devon
Pearl-class corvettes
Maritime incidents in June 1860